The East Fork Coquille River is a tributary, about  long, of the North Fork Coquille River in the U.S. state of Oregon. It begins near Bennett Rock in Douglas County in the Southern Oregon Coast Range.

The East Fork flows generally west through the Brewster Valley near the rural community of Sitkum to the vicinity of Dora in Coos County. Downstream of Dora, the river turns southwest to meet the North Fork at Gravelford.

The land in the watershed is used mainly for timber production and farming; commercial forests dominate in much of the region.

Tributaries
Named tributaries of the East Fork Coquille River from source to mouth are Knepper, Lost, Dead Horse, Camas, Brummit, China, and Bills creeks. Then come Steel and Hantz creeks followed by Yankee Run. Below that are Elk and Weekly creeks.

Recreation
Frona County Park near Dora and Bennett County Park near Gravelford are campgrounds and day-use areas for picnicking and fishing.

The East Fork supports populations of cutthroat trout, steelhead, and Chinook and coho salmon. Frona Park has a steelhead acclimation pond along Hantz Creek. Only finclipped steelhead may be caught and kept, and the river is closed to coho fishing.

See also
 List of rivers of Oregon

References

External links
Coquille Watershed Association

Rivers of Coos County, Oregon
Rivers of Douglas County, Oregon
Rivers of Oregon